WTLD (90.5 FM) is a Christian radio station broadcasting a Gospel format. Licensed to Jesup, Georgia, United States.  The station is currently owned by Resurrection House Ministries, Inc.

History
The station went on the air as WBKF on 1999-04-30.  On 1999-07-09, the station changed its call sign to the current WTLD.

References

External links

TLD